The Oxford Union Society, commonly referred to simply as the Oxford Union, is a debating society in the city of Oxford, England, whose membership is drawn primarily from the University of Oxford. Founded in 1823, it is one of Britain's oldest university unions and one of the world's most prestigious private students' societies. The Oxford Union exists independently from the university and is distinct from the Oxford University Student Union.

The Oxford Union has a tradition of hosting some of the world's most prominent individuals across politics, academia, and popular culture.

History and status

Genesis 
The Oxford Union was founded as an independent forum for unrestricted debate by junior members of Oxford University, which at that time prohibited junior members from discussing certain issues, such as theology. Although such restrictions have since been lifted, it has remained separate from and independent of the university and is constitutionally bound to remain so.

Status 
The Oxford Union is an unincorporated association; its property is held in trust in favour of its objectives and members, and governed by its rules (which form a multi-partite contract between the members).

Women members 
Until 1963, women were excluded from membership of the Oxford Union. The admission of women to the Union required a 2/3 vote of its past and current members.  The first vote to admit women failed, with 903 men voting to admit women and 459 voting against. The second vote, on 9 February 1963, succeeded, 1,039 to 427. Oxford student Judith Okely, who had led the campaign to admit women, then became the first woman member. Geraldine Jones of St Hugh's College was in 1967 the first woman to be elected President of the Oxford Union.

Membership 

Membership of the Oxford Union falls into four classes: life membership, long-term membership, temporary membership, and residential membership.  Temporary membership can take four forms: course-length membership, termly membership, visiting membership, and (confusingly) permanent membership.

Life and long-term membership 
All matriculated members of Oxford University are eligible to become life members of the Union, as are spouses of life members. Certain other specific members of the University are also eligible for life membership, as are their spouses.

Members of the following kindred societies are also eligible to apply for life membership of the Union:

Cambridge Union
Durham Union
Conference Olivant
Trinity College, Dublin's University Philosophical Society
Yale Political Union
Harvard Political Union

All those eligible for life membership can instead apply for long-term membership for a period of at least the duration of their course, and all such long-term members can, while eligible, apply to transfer to life membership.

Temporary membership 

Students at certain other educational institutions in Oxford are entitled to join for the duration of their course.  These institutions are:

Magna Carta College
Oxford Brookes University
Oxford Centre for Islamic Studies
Oxford Centre for Hebrew and Jewish Studies 
Ripon College, Cuddesdon
Ruskin College
Sarah Lawrence College

Such shorter membership is also extended to staff members of the University of Oxford or any of its colleges or permanent private halls. Members of a number of other institutions, together with those participating in some visiting study programmes in Oxford, are also eligible to apply for temporary membership, while members of Oxford Brookes University alone are entitled to apply for permanent membership.

Guests staying at the Oxford Union Society/Landmark Trust flat in the Old Steward’s House are deemed to be visiting members of the Society for the duration of their stay in the flat.

Residential membership 

Residential memberships are available to Oxford residents who are not from the university, but only if they are deemed worthy by a full meeting of the Union's Standing Committee after submitting a written application to the Secretary and subsequent interview by a member of the Standing Committee.

The Union buildings 
The Oxford Union buildings are located in Frewin Court (off Cornmarket Street) and on St Michael's Street, and are owned by a separate charitable trust, the Oxford Literary and Debating Union Trust ("OLDUT").

OLDUT 
The Oxford Union was never financially secure and had a significant level of historic debt associated with the erection of its buildings. Following a particularly bad period in the 1970s, the Union buildings were sold to OLDUT (the Oxford Literary and Debating  Union Trust), and the Oxford Union Society was granted a licence to occupy the building.

Several parts of what were historically the Union buildings and grounds were subsequently either sold or made the subject of long leases, including an area of land around the rear of the debating chamber, part of the Union cellars (adjoining that now occupied by the LGBTQ+ venue Plush), and part of what was formerly the Steward's house (now occupied by the Landmark Trust).

The creation of OLDUT secured the future of the Union's buildings such that even if the Oxford Union Society were to cease to be or fail financially the buildings would not be lost. OLDUT's principal sources of funds are private donations and grant funding (including from the Mitsubishi UFJ Trust Oxford Foundation), rent on investment property and hiring fees. OLDUT uses these funds to provide financial support for the refurbishment and maintenance of the Union buildings and the operation of the Union's library and reading-rooms.

The buildings 
The original Union buildings were designed by Benjamin Woodward and opened in 1857. The society soon outgrew these premises and commissioned Alfred Waterhouse to design a free-standing debating chamber in the gardens, which opened in 1879. This was about a decade after the completion of the Cambridge Union's premises (also designed by Waterhouse), and the exteriors of the two buildings are very similar.
 

The original Woodward debating chamber is now known as "The Old Library". The Old Library is best known for its Pre-Raphaelite paintings by Dante Gabriel Rossetti, Edward Burne-Jones and William Morris, referred to collectively as the Oxford Union murals. The current debating chamber and several further extensions to the main buildings were added over the next forty years. The final extension was designed in a conventional Gothic Revival style by Walter Mills and Thorpe, and built in 1910–11. It provides the MacMillan Room (the Union dining room) and Snooker Room on the first floor above the Goodman Library, underneath which there are basement library stacks. The Union also consists of a Bar on the ground floor, the Gladstone Room (a reception room) and the Morris Room (a meeting room) on the first floor, and a Members' TV Room on the second (uppermost) floor, along with separate offices for the President, Librarian, Treasurer and Secretary.

Many of the rooms in the Union are named after figures from the Union's past, such as the Goodman Library with its oriel windows and the wood-panelled Macmillan Room with barrel ceiling. The buildings have gradually been added to with paintings and statues of past presidents and prominent members.

The Old Library contains a fireplace situated in the middle of the floor with a concealed flue, a rare design of which only a handful of examples survive in the UK.

The debating chamber features busts of such notables as Roy Jenkins, Edward Heath, Michael Heseltine, George Curzon and William Gladstone. It is also home to a grand piano, known as the "Bartlet-Jones Piano" after the Oxford University Music Society president who found it dusty and forgotten in a cupboard in the Holywell Music Room and placed it on permanent loan to the Union. The piano was unveiled by Vladimir Ashkenazy who famously refused to play it in front of the packed chamber because he "had not warmed up". The despatch boxes which continue to be used in Union debates are modelled on those in the House of Commons and were offered to the House during World War II.

As recently as the 1970s the Oxford Union still provided a full silver service dining room for its members which, like its famous bar, was the afternoon and evening venue of choice for many of the university's leading undergraduate journalists and politicos. To be invited to dine at the large table in the bay window - the usual domain of the Union's president - was considered the acme of attainment in that particular sphere of the university. It was often said more plots were hatched around that particular table on a regular evening than in the Houses of Parliament on Bonfire Night.  Similarly, the Union's two libraries were extensively used by that same cadre of undergraduates (principally humanities students) who were rushing at the last minute to complete the obligatory weekly essay for their formal university education.

The Union's buildings were used as a location for each of the films Oxford Blues (1984) and The Madness of King George (1994).

Debating 
Debating at the Oxford Union takes two forms — competitive debating and chamber debating.

Competitive debating offers members of the Union debate workshops and a platform upon which to practise and improve their debating skills. The Union's best debaters compete internationally against other top debating societies, and the Oxford Union regularly fields successful teams at the World Universities Debating Championship (which the Union hosted in 1993) and the European Universities Debating Championship.

The Union also runs the Oxford Schools' Debating Competition and Oxford Intervarsity Debating Competition, which both respectively attract schools and universities from around the world, as well as running a number of internal debating competitions.

Chamber debates occur every Thursday evening during University terms. Experts for the proposition and opposition present paper speeches to the house. Members have an opportunity to deliver brief speeches from the floor. Following the style of the British Parliament, a motion is moved to "divide the House" in order to vote. Members in the chamber vote on the proposition with their feet by exiting the hall through a door, the right-hand side of which is marked 'ayes' and the left-hand side 'noes'.

Oxford Union Society debates are filmed and licensed by Oxford Union Limited, a registered company controlled by the Oxford Union Society.

Retractions of speaker invitations 
In a few notable cases the Union has withdrawn invitations to controversial speakers, as the result of public pressure, specific pressure by lobbyists, and concerns about safety.

1998: John Tyndall 

A debate that was to have involved the far-right fascist leader John Tyndall was met with a campaign of resistance in 1998. This opposition, coupled with police advice following a series of racially motivated nail-bombings in London, resulted in the cancellation of the debate.

2001: David Irving 

An invitation to the writer and Holocaust denier David Irving to speak in a debate on censorship in 2001 was met by a coordinated campaign by left-wing, Jewish, and anti-fascist groups, together with the elected leadership of the Oxford University Student Union, to have the invitation withdrawn. Following a meeting of Union members, and a subsequent meeting of the Union's governing body, the Standing Committee, the President decided the debate would have to be cancelled. However, Irving was allowed to speak at a Union debate in 2007.

2009: Philip Nitschke 

In March 2009, the Union withdrew an invitation to euthanasia campaigner Philip Nitschke after Nitschke had already accepted the invitation. Nitschke received a second e-mail cancelling the invitation "in the interests of there being a 'fair debate'", and was told other speakers were unwilling to speak alongside him. The debate topic was the legalisation of assisted suicide, a field in which Nitschke is prominent. The reason given by Oxford Union President Corey Dixon was that two other speakers "disagree with his particular take on [assisted suicide]". According to Dixon, the speakers who successfully pressured the Union to withdraw Nitschke's invitation were a member of the public, whose brother had undergone assisted death, and British euthanasia campaigner Michael Irwin. However, Irwin denied that he had applied pressure to exclude Nitschke.

The Oxford Union released a statement explaining the decision: "An administrative decision was made to ensure we had three speakers on each side of the debate, which was proving difficult due to Nitschke's attendance. It is always in the interests of the Oxford Union to ensure a balanced debate with as wide-ranging views as possible represented. There may have been miscommunication between the Oxford Union and Nitschke. We certainly hope that no offence has been caused. The Oxford Union is a neutral institution and holds no opinion on Nitschke's views."

Nitschke commented, "This famous society has a long tradition of championing free speech. To suggest that my views on end-of-life issues are inappropriate simply because I believe that all rational elderly adults should have access to the best end-of-life information beggars belief." He also called the act "an almost unprecedented act of censorship". Nitschke gave a series of lectures across the UK at the time the debate was held.

Controversies

1933: King and Country Debate 

The Oxford Union has long associated itself with freedom of speech, most famously by debating and passing the motion "This House would under no circumstances fight for its King and country" in 1933. The debate polarized opinion across the country, with the Daily Telegraph running an article headlined "DISLOYALTY AT OXFORD: GESTURE TOWARDS THE REDS".

Several prominent Union members (including Randolph Churchill) tried to expunge this motion and the result of the debate from the Union's minute book. This attempt was defeated in a meeting more attended than the original debate. Sir Edward Heath records in his memoirs that Randolph Churchill was then chased around Oxford by undergraduates who intended to debag him (i.e., humiliate him by removing his trousers), and was then fined by the police for being illegally parked.

1996: OJ Simpson 
In May 1996 President Paul Kenward invited O. J. Simpson to address the union, his first public address since his October acquittal by a Los Angeles jury of murdering his ex-wife Nicole Brown Simpson and her friend Ron Goldman in 1994. Speaking for 90 minutes in front of 1,300 students, Simpson spoke of racism in the Los Angeles Police Department, and said he was sorry for hitting his wife, Nicole.

Paul Kenward had given O. J. Simpson assurances there would be no broadcast media at the union debate. However, Chris Philp, (now Conservative MP and then a second-year student at University College and features editor of the student magazine Cherwell), was fined £50 for selling a written transcript of the debate and helping to sell an audio cassette to TV stations.

2007: David Irving / Nick Griffin debate 
In November 2007, President Luke Tryl sparked controversy by inviting Holocaust denier David Irving and British National Party leader Nick Griffin to speak at a Union forum on the topic of free speech. The Student Population at a Council meeting voted to oppose the invitations. Following this and protests by other student groups, a poll of the Union's members was taken and resulted in a two-to-one majority in favour of the invitations.

On the evening of the planned debate several hundred protesters gathered outside the Union buildings, chanting anti-fascist slogans and later preventing guests and Union members from entering the premises. Around 20 protesters succeeded in breaching the poorly maintained security cordon and attempted to force their way through to the main chamber. Members of the waiting audience blocked access by pushing back against the chamber doors. After students were convinced to yield to the protesters by Union staff, a sit-in protest was staged in the debating chamber, preventing a full debate from occurring due to security concerns. Because of a lack of security personnel, a number of students from the audience eventually came to take on the responsibilities of controlling events, in one instance preventing a scuffle from breaking out between a protester and members of the audience, and eventually assisting police in herding protesters from the main hall. One student protester interviewed by BBC News reported that fellow protesters played 'jingles' on the piano and danced on the President's chair though the truth of the latter assertion was seriously questioned by eyewitnesses. Smaller debates were eventually held with Irving and Griffin in separate rooms, amid criticism that the police and Union officials had not foreseen the degree of unrest which the controversial invitations would arouse.

The President of Oxford University Student Union, Martin McCluskey, strongly criticised the decision to proceed with the debate, saying that providing Irving and Griffin with a platform for their extreme views afforded them undue legitimacy. Following the event, some, including Oxford MP Evan Harris, criticised the No Platform Policy adopted by the Student Union.

2015: Marine Le Pen 
In February 2015, the Union invited Marine Le Pen, the leader of the Front National in France, to address the Union, in view of the popularity of the FN in the French polls at the time. This sparked considerable controversy, with allegations of Le Pen endorsing anti-Semitism and Islamophobia. The speech went ahead as planned, albeit delayed by the protesters blockading the Union's main entrance, and briefly breaking into the building. In all, over 400 people turned up to the demonstration. There was considerable controversy over OUSU's response, with allegations that OUSU had indirectly supported the protesters and not adequately condemned threats of violence against Union members who had attempted to attend the talk.

2018: Heather Marsh 

In 2018, human rights activist Heather Marsh accused the Oxford Union of censorship and violating a contractual obligation when they failed to post video of a "Whistleblowing" panel in which she appeared to the official Oxford Union YouTube channel, allegedly at the request of a fellow panelist, former CIA operative David Shedd. Oxford Union president Gui Cavalcanti replied that its agreement with Marsh and other panelists gave them the right but not the obligation to publish video of any events, adding that "just this academic year, we’ve had multiple events not uploaded, ranging from J. J. Abrams to Sir Patrick Stewart." A transcript of the panel and its 22-minute audio are available online.

2019: Ebenezer Azamati 
In October 2019, before the annual 'No Confidence' debate, blind Ghanaian graduate student Ebenezer Azamati was violently removed from the hall for refusing to relinquish his seat, which had been reserved for a committee member. Azmati later had his membership revoked for two terms for 'violent misconduct'. Footage of the event was recorded by another member, and was subsequently uploaded to the internet. This led to protests from the University's AfriSoc society on Azmati's behalf, and soon gained national news media coverage. This was eventually followed by the resignation of standing committee members and other Union officials, and then by Union president Brendan McGrath on 19 November. Azmati was compensated an undisclosed amount.

Governance 

The Oxford Union's general conduct and management is governed by the Standing Committee. The voting members are:
 The Junior Officers (The President, President-Elect, Junior Librarian, Junior Treasurer, Librarian-Elect, Treasurer-Elect, and the Secretary)
 Six elected members
 Any recent Junior Officers who have chosen to serve, eligible under Rule 24(b)(i)

The non-voting members are: 
 The Returning Officer - responsible for the conduct of the Union's elections and for the interpretation of the Union's Rules and Standing Orders
 The Chair of the Consultative Committee - responsible for logistics and facilitation of events
 The Chair of the Debate Selection Committee - responsible for overseeing the debating wing of the Union
 The Senior Officers (the Senior Librarian and the Senior Treasurer) -  generally Oxford University academics and who must be members of the Union, responsible for supervising the Society's finances and libraries
 The Union's Trustees

The Bursar and the Access Officers attend meetings of Standing Committee in an advisory capacity.

Day-to-day management of the Union is partly conducted by professional staff, principally the Bursar and the House Manager.

Elections 
Elections are held to fill the offices of President-elect, Librarian-elect, Treasurer-elect and Secretary, as well as 6 positions on the Standing Committee and 11 positions on the Secretary's Committee. In order to stand for election to the Secretary's Committee, members must make two speeches on different nights during the term they stand for election. For the other offices, candidates must have additionally made two such speeches in the previous term. Elections are always held on Friday of 7th Week, as defined by the University terms.

The election for the Chair of the Consultative Committee is held at the meeting of the Consultative Committee on Monday of 8th Week of each term. Only members who have attended four of the last eight meetings of the Consultative Committee may either stand for election as Chair or vote.

The number of elected positions on standing Committee was increased from 5 to 7 in Michael Li's term (Trinity 2017) and implemented in Chris Zabilowicz's term (Michaelmas 2017). However, the number of elected positions was decreased back to 5 officers at the end of James Price's term (Hilary term 2021). Reasons included the manageability of such a large committee and concerns of costs.

Students running for election usually stand as part of a team, known as 'slates', enabling voters to support a designated candidate for each position and increase each candidates' vote count. This practice has come under criticism recently due to the dominance of a single slate and the resulting unopposed elections. In Michaelmas 2018, a motion was passed banning slates for two terms followed by a referendum on the practice.

Past officers 
Notable past Presidents and Junior Officers of the Oxford Union include

 Eric Anthony Abrahams (Cabinet minister in Jamaica): President (MT 1964)
Jonathan Aitken (UK Cabinet minister 1992-95): Librarian
Tariq Ali (author): President (TT 1965)
H. H. Asquith (UK Prime Minister): President (TT 1874)
Lalith Athulathmudali (Cabinet minister in Sri Lanka): President (HT 1958)
S. W. R. D. Bandaranaike (Prime Minister of Ceylon 1956-1959):  Treaaurer (TT 1924)
Ruzwana Bashir (entrepreneur): President (MT 2004)
Hilaire Belloc (author): President (HT 1895)
Michael Beloff (barrister, President of Trinity College): President (MT 1962) 
Benazir Bhutto (Prime Minister of Pakistan): President (HT 1977)
Gyles Brandreth (UK Member of Parliament, comedian): President (MT 1969)
John Buchan (author): President (HT 1899)
Anthony Crosland (UK Foreign Secretary): President (TT 1946)
Edwina Currie (UK Cabinet minister): Librarian
Lord Curzon (UK Foreign Secretary 1919-24): President (MT 1880)
Robin Day (BBC Presenter): President (TT 1950)
Lord James Douglas-Hamilton (Junior Scottish minister 1987-97): President (TT 1964)
Michael Foot (Labour leader): President (MT 1933)
Paul Foot (journalist, dep. ed. Private Eye): President (TT 1961)
William Ewart Gladstone (UK Prime Minister): President (MT 1830)
Michael Gove (UK Lord Chancellor): President (HT 1988)
Sam Gyimah (UK Member of Parliament): President (MT 1997)
William Hague (UK Foreign Secretary): President (MT 1981)
Denis Healey (UK Chancellor of the Exchequer): Librarian
Edward Heath (UK Prime Minister): President (HT 1939)
Michael Heseltine (UK Deputy Prime Minister): President (MT 1954)
Damian Hinds (UK Member of Parliament): President (TT 1991)
Douglas Hogg (UK Cabinet minister): President (MT 1965)
Quentin Hogg (Lord Hailsham, UK Lord Chancellor): President (TT 1929)
Christopher Hollis (UK Member of Parliament): President (MT 1923)
Anthony Howard (journalist): President (TT 1955)
Jeremy Isaacs (TV executive): President (HT 1955)
Peter Jay (journalist, Chairman of OLDUT Trustees): President (TT 1960)
Roy Jenkins (UK Chancellor of the Exchequer): Librarian
Boris Johnson (UK Prime Minister): President (TT 1986)
Humayun Kabir (Indian politician) Librarian 1931
Lakshman Kadirgamar (Minister of Foreign Affairs of Sri Lanka 1994-2001): President (HT 1959)
Uwe Kitzinger (head of INSEAD, Founder of Templeton College): President (HT 1950)
Cosmo Gordon Lang (Archbishop of Canterbury): President (MT 1884)
David Lewis (Canadian Member of Parliament): President (HT 1934)
Harold Macmillan (UK Prime Minister): Librarian
Henry Edward Manning (Archbishop of Westminster 1865-1892): President (MT 1829)
Philip May (husband of UK Prime Minister): President (TT 1979)
Louise Mensch (UK Member of Parliament): Secretary (1991?)
Viscount Monckton (UK Cabinet minister 1951-57): President (HT 1913)
Nicky Morgan (UK Member of Parliament): Treasurer
John Playfair Price (UK diplomat): President (TT 1927)
Julian Priestley (Secretary-General of the European Parliament 1997–2007): President (HT 1972)
Jacob Rees-Mogg (UK Member of Parliament): Librarian (1990)
William Rees-Mogg (Editor of 'The Times'): President (TT 1951)
Andrew Rowe (UK Member of Parliament): Librarian
3rd Marquess of Salisbury (UK Prime Minister): Secretary (MT 1848)
F. E. Smith (Lord Birkenhead, UK Lord Chancellor): President (TT 1894)
Montek Singh Ahluwalia (economist, IMF): President (MT 1966)
Andrew Sullivan (political commentator): President (TT 1983)
William Temple (Archbishop of Canterbury): President (HT 1904)
Jeremy Thorpe (UK Liberal leader): President (HT 1951)
Anthony Wedgwood-Benn (UK Cabinet minister): President (TT 1947)
Ann Widdecombe (UK Member of Parliament): Secretary (1971), Treasurer (1972)

(MT = Michalemas Term; HT = Hilary Term; TT = Trinity Term)

See also 
 List of presidents of the Oxford Union
 Cambridge Union
 Durham Union
 Olivaint Conference of Belgium

References

External links 

 
1823 establishments in the United Kingdom
Student debating societies
History of Oxford
Culture in Oxford
Politics of Oxford
Alfred Waterhouse buildings
Grade II* listed buildings in Oxford